Tomashpil (literally "the city of St Thomas") is an urban-type settlement in the eastern Podolia, specifically in Tulchyn Raion of Vinnytsia Oblast in central Ukraine. Tomashpil is situated on the banks of the Rusava River. Tomashpil is the administrative district of Tomashpil Raion (780 km2), home to 40.608 people scattered over the town and 30 villages around. Population: 

The closest railway station is Vapniarka, 19 km away. It is accessible by taxi or a small bus called a 'Marshrutka'.

History
The area of Tomshpil and all of Bratslav Voivodeship was part of the Grand Duchy of Lithuania until 1569. And in 1569 (with the Union of Lublin) it passed to the  Polish kingdom. The first historical mention in the documents dates to 1616, when Tomashpil and the entire Podolia belonged to the Kingdom of Poland (Polish Crown). During Polish rule Tomshpil belonged to Braclaw Voivoidship. In 1793, during the Second Partition of Poland, Tomashpil and Eastern Podolia passed from Poland to the Russian empire. It was part of short-lived Ukrainian National Republic (UNR) in 1917–1919. From 1922 until 1991 it was in the USSR (Ukrainian Soviet Socialist Republic). Since 1991 it has been a part of independent Ukraine.

The name Tomashpil stems from Polish name for Thomas—Tomasz, pronounced as "Tomash". The ending "pil" (-pol) is presumably from Greek "polis" (city) or Slavic "pole" (field).

Tomashpil Jews
The earliest known Jewish community was 17th century. 1939 Jewish population (census) was 3,252. Affecting the Jewish community were Khmelnytskyi Pogroms in 1648–9, pogroms in 1919–20, the shooting of 350 Jews on August 4, 1941, and the 1941–1944 ghetto. The Jewish cemetery was established in 1928 with last known Hasidic burial in 1994. The cemetery is located just South of Tomashphil, on a hillside on the right side of the road leading to Yampil. It is bordering a much newer Polish cemetery. Although many of the older grave markers are difficult to read, there are many newer ones that are well maintained. There is also a mass grave for the 350 Jews shot in 1941. Today, Tomashpol is considered a Ukrainian town and few Jews remain living there, although sometimes groups or individuals come searching for the gravestones or houses of their relatives. Some of the old Jewish houses remain on the old street near the central marketplace, although most are in disrepair.

Industries and enterprises
There is a sugar plant and textile industries in Tomashpil. The sugar factory was built in the beginning of the 20th century and it still operational 3 months out of the year when the sugar crop comes in. The biggest deposit of sawn stone in Ukraine is situated in Vinnytsia oblast 10 km from Tomashpil.

Population
 1970 – 2,100
 1994 – 5,944

People from Tomashpil
 Vladyslav Dubinchak (born 1998), Ukrainian footballer

References

Urban-type settlements in Tulchyn Raion
Podolia Governorate
Holocaust locations in Ukraine